Gaisano Grand Malls  is a chain of shopping malls under the Philippine-based Gaisano Grand Group of Companies. It operates primarily within the Visayas and Mindanao regions of the Philippines.

History
In the 1970s, Modesta Singson Gaisano established White Gold Department Store in Cebu City. After her death in 1981, her five sons - David, Stephen, Henry, Victor and John, pursued their respective retail operations. Gaisano Grand Malls was founded by Benito S. Gaisano, son of Henry S. Gaisano.

Branches

As of December 2015, there are 36 Gaisano Grand Malls in Visayas and Mindanao, 13 of which are found within the island of Cebu.
The Gaisano Grand Group plans to have 50 malls under the Gaisano Grand Malls brand by 2020.

See also
Ayala Malls
Gaisano family
SM Supermalls
Gaisano Malls

References

External links
 

Companies based in Cebu City
Shopping malls in the Philippines
Philippine brands